Weiden is an electoral constituency (German: Wahlkreis) represented in the Bundestag. It elects one member via first-past-the-post voting. Under the current constituency numbering system, it is designated as constituency 235. It is located in northeastern Bavaria, comprising the city of Weiden in der Oberpfalz and the districts of Neustadt an der Waldnaab and Tirschenreuth.

Weiden was created for the inaugural 1949 federal election. Since 2005, it has been represented by Albert Rupprecht of the Christian Social Union (CSU).

Geography
Weiden is located in northeastern Bavaria. As of the 2021 federal election, it comprises the independent city of Weiden in der Oberpfalz and the districts of Neustadt an der Waldnaab and Tirschenreuth.

History
Weiden was created in 1949, then known as Tirschenreuth. It acquired its current name in the 1976 election. In the 1949 election, it was Bavaria constituency 23 in the numbering system. In the 1953 through 1961 elections, it was number 218. In the 1965 through 1998 elections, it was number 221. In the 2002 and 2005 elections, it was number 236. Since the 2009 election, it has been number 235.

Originally, the constituency comprised the independent city of Weiden in der Oberpfalz and the districts of Tirschenreuth, Neustadt an der Waldnaab, and Kemnath. In the 1965 through 1972 elections, also contained the district of Eschenbach. It acquired its current borders in the 1976 election.

Members
The constituency has been held continuously by the Christian Social Union (CSU) since its creation. It was first represented by Hans Bodensteiner from 1949 to 1953. He was elected for the CSU, but defected to co-found the All-German People's Party (GVP) in November 1952. followed by Hugo Geiger from 1953 to 1961. Franz Weigl served from 1961 to 1972. Max Kunz was then representative from 1972 to 1990. Simon Wittmann served two terms from 1990 to 1998, followed by Georg Girisch from 1998 to 2005. Albert Rupprecht was elected in 2005, and re-elected in 2009, 2013, 2017, and 2021.

Election results

2021 election

2017 election

2013 election

2009 election

Notes

References

Federal electoral districts in Bavaria
1949 establishments in West Germany
Constituencies established in 1949
Neustadt an der Waldnaab (district)
Tirschenreuth (district)